Naveen William Sidney Andrews (born 17 January 1969) is a British-American actor. He is best known for his role as Sayid Jarrah in the television series Lost (2004–2010), for which he was nominated for a Golden Globe Award and a Primetime Emmy Award, as well as winning a Screen Actors Guild Award along with the cast. He has also appeared in films such as The English Patient (1996), Mighty Joe Young (1998), Rollerball (2002), Bride and Prejudice (2004), Planet Terror (2007), The Brave One (2007), and Diana (2013). In 2022, he starred in the miniseries The Dropout.

Early life
Andrews was born in Lambeth, London, to Nirmala, a psychologist, and Stanley Andrews, a businessman, both immigrants from Kerala, India. He was brought up in Wandsworth as a Methodist, and attended Earlsfield Junior School on Tranmere Road. Andrews described his upbringing as "very repressive". At 16, while at Emanuel School, he started a relationship with his 30-year-old mathematics teacher, Geraldine Feakins, whom he moved in with to escape his abusive home; their son, Jaisal, was born seven years later, in 1992. Andrews was shunned by his parents after this and they died before a reconciliation. He has said that he has forgiven them.

Career
Andrews auditioned for drama school and was accepted at London's Guildhall School of Music and Drama with Ewan McGregor and David Thewlis. His studies paid off when he won a role in Hanif Kureshi's film London Kills Me (1991). Andrews starred in the 1993 BBC miniseries Buddha of Suburbia. He portrayed Kip Singh in The English Patient (1996) and Sayid Jarrah in the popular television series Lost (2004–10). In 2006, he was voted one of People magazine's World's Most Beautiful People. He starred in Kama Sutra: A Tale of Love (1996), Mighty Joe Young (1998), Bride and Prejudice (2004), and as Jafar in the American fantasy drama Once Upon a Time in Wonderland (2013–14). In 2014, he provided the voice of Sabal in the video game Far Cry 4. From 2015 to 2017, he starred in the series Sense8 (created by The Wachowskis and J. Michael Straczynski) as Jonas. From 2018 to 2019, he co-starred as ex-MI6 and CIA officer Julian Cousins in the series Instinct, starring Alan Cumming and Bojana Novakovic. In 2022 Andrews co-starred with Amanda Seyfried as Theranos COO Sunny Balwani in the hulu limited series The Dropout.

Personal life
Andrews's relationship with Geraldine Feakins lasted from 1985 to 1991. Their son, Jaisal Andrews, was born in 1992. He was later in a relationship with actress Barbara Hershey in Los Angeles, starting in 1998. The couple separated briefly in 2005 and, during that time, Andrews had a son with Czech-French actress Elena Eustache. He and Hershey later reconciled, but in 2010, they announced that they had separated. Andrews was in a long custody dispute with Eustache over their son, and on 7 January 2009, he was granted sole legal and physical custody.

Andrews has spoken about his alcoholism and his two-year addiction to heroin in the mid-'90s. He has described an incident in which he collapsed on set and was treated by emergency services.

He plays guitar and sings, while tap dancing to his own tune as a hobby. He became a naturalised U.S. citizen on 27 May 2010.

Filmography

Film

Television

Video games

References

External links

Living people
Alumni of the Guildhall School of Music and Drama
American male film actors
American male television actors
American male voice actors
American male actors of Indian descent
British male actors of Indian descent
English emigrants to the United States
English male actors of South Asian descent
English people of Indian descent
English male film actors
English male television actors
English male voice actors
American people of Malayali descent
People educated at Emanuel School
People from Wandsworth
English Methodists
20th-century English male actors
21st-century English male actors
20th-century American male actors
21st-century American male actors
1969 births